In genetics, the term horizontal resistance was first used by J.E. Vanderplank to describe many-gene resistance, which is sometimes also called generalized resistance. This contrasts with the term vertical resistance which was used to describe single-gene resistance. Raoul A. Robinson further refined the definition of horizontal resistance.  Unlike vertical resistance and parasitic ability, horizontal resistance and horizontal parasitic ability are entirely independent of each other in genetic terms.

In the first round of breeding for horizontal resistance, plants are exposed to pathogens and selected for partial resistance. Those with no resistance die, and plants unaffected by the pathogen have vertical resistance and are removed.  The remaining plants have partial resistance and their seed is stored and bred back up to sufficient volume for further testing.  The hope is that in these remaining plants are multiple types of partial-resistance genes, and by crossbreeding this pool back on itself, multiple partial resistance genes will come together and provide resistance to a larger variety of pathogens.

Successive rounds of breeding for horizontal resistance proceed in a more traditional fashion, selecting plants for disease resistance as measured by yield. These plants are exposed to native regional pathogens, and given minimal assistance in fighting them.

References

Phytopathology
Molecular biology